The  is a railway line in Kyushu, Japan, operated by the Kyushu Railway Company (JR Kyushu). It connects Kurume Station, Kurume in Fukuoka Prefecture and Ōita Station, Ōita in Ōita Prefecture. It is also known as the Yufu Kōgen Line.

The line crosses the whole of Kyushu, approximately paralleling the Chikugo River and its tributary the Kusu River near Kurume, and along the Ōita River close to Ōita. It also traverses popular tourist resorts such as Hita (known as Little Kyoto) and spa resorts around Yufu.

Stations

History
In 1915, the Daito Railway Co. opened the 22 km Oita - Onoya section. The company was nationalised in 1922, and westerly extensions were undertaken in stages from 1923 until Amagase was reached in 1933. The Kurume - Chikugoyoshi opened in 1928, and easterly extensions to Amagase opened between 1931 and 1934.

CTC signalling was commissioned over the entire line in 1984, and freight services ceased in 1987.

Typhoon damage
In 2012, a landslide disrupted services for 6 weeks.

On 5 July 2017, torrential rainfall washed out the bridge over the Oita River between Chikugo Oisha and Teruoka, resulting in the closure of the section. According to the Japanese language Wikipedia article, the line was fully re-opened on 14 July 2018.

Previous connecting/transfer lines

Era Station: the 27 km Miyanoharu Line to Higo-oguni opened between 1937 and 1954. Freight services ceased in 1971, and the line closed on 1 December 1984.
Kurume Station: the 46 km  gauge Chigoku Line to Mameda opened between 1904 and 1916, and was electrified at 600 V DC in 1919. It had three short branch lines (1 to 4 km long). The entire system closed in 1929.

References

Lines of Kyushu Railway Company
1067 mm gauge railways in Japan
Railway lines opened in 1915
1915 establishments in Japan